Mehdi bey Hajinski Suleyman bey oglu (1879–1941) was an Azerbaijani actor, publicist and statesman who served as the State Controller of Azerbaijan Democratic Republic and first general secretary of Parliament of Azerbaijan, and was a member of Azerbaijani National Council.

Early years
Hajinski was born in 1879 in Baku, Azerbaijan. Since 1906, he was the director of the theater department of charity society Nijat and from 1914 he was deputy director of theater department of Sefa society. Considered a noble writer, Hajinski published numerous articles about the Azerbaijani theater, arts and culture of the country, Since 1908, he also acted on stage. He was the person who first awarded Uzeyir Hajibeyov for his Leyli and Majnun opera.

Political career
Upon the dissolution of Transcaucasian Democratic Federative Republic, Hajinski became a member of the Presidium of Azerbaijani National Council, an interim body of the government which proclaimed the independence of Azerbaijan Democratic Republic on May 28, 1918. When the first Azerbaijani Parliament convened on December 7, 1918 Hajinski was elected the first deputy of Alimardan Topchubashev and chief secretary of the parliament. When the third cabinet of Azerbaijan Democratic Republic was formed by Fatali Khan Khoyski, Hajinski was appointed State Controller of ADR.

After Bolshevik take over of Azerbaijan, Hajinski remained in the country. He died in Baku in 1941.

See also
Azerbaijani National Council
Cabinets of Azerbaijan Democratic Republic (1918-1920)
Current Cabinet of Azerbaijan Republic
Hajinski

References

1879 births
1941 deaths
Azerbaijani Muslims
Politicians from Baku
Azerbaijan Democratic Republic politicians
Government ministers of Azerbaijan
Azerbaijani publicists
Soviet rehabilitations
Members of the National Assembly of the Azerbaijan Democratic Republic
Translators to Azerbaijani
Alumni by Baku Real School